The enzyme N-acetylglucosamine-1-phosphodiester α-N-acetylglucosaminidase (EC 3.1.4.45) catalyzes the reaction

glycoprotein N-acetyl-D-glucosaminyl-phospho-D-mannose + H2O  N-acetyl-D-glucosamine + glycoprotein phospho-D-mannose

This enzyme belongs to the family of hydrolases, specifically those acting on phosphoric diester bonds.  The systematic name is glycoprotein-N-acetyl-D-glucosaminyl-phospho-D-mannose N-acetyl-D-glucosaminylphosphohydrolase. Other names in common use include α-N-acetylglucosaminyl phosphodiesterase, lysosomal α-N-acetylglucosaminidase, phosphodiester glycosidase, α-N-acetyl-D-glucosamine-1-phosphodiester, ''N''-acetylglucosaminidase, 2-acetamido-2-deoxy-α-D-glucose 1-phosphodiester, and acetamidodeoxyglucohydrolase.

References

EC 3.1.4
Enzymes of unknown structure